Liebshausen is an Ortsgemeinde – a municipality belonging to a Verbandsgemeinde, a kind of collective municipality – in the Rhein-Hunsrück-Kreis (district) in Rhineland-Palatinate, Germany. It belongs to the Verbandsgemeinde Simmern-Rheinböllen, whose seat is in Simmern.

Geography

Location
The municipality lies in the Hunsrück roughly 4 km northwest of Rheinböllen and 10 km west-southwest of the Rhine at Bacharach. Liebshausen lies just west of the Autobahn A 61. The municipal area measures 548 ha, of which 5 ha is wooded.

History
In 1006, Liebshausen had its first documentary mention on the occasion of a church consecration in Mörschbach. Beginning in 1794, Liebshausen lay under French rule. In 1814 it was assigned to the Kingdom of Prussia at the Congress of Vienna. Since 1946, it has been part of the then newly founded state of Rhineland-Palatinate.

Liebshausen was said in the late 18th century to be a favourite hideout among robbers and horse thieves. It was here that the robber Philipp Ludwig Mosebach (“Jäger-Philipp”, Jäger being German for “hunter” or “rifleman”), a clergyman’s ne’er-do-well son and the leader of the Hunsrück-Bande, a lawless gang, stayed. Mosebach was eventually put to death in Koblenz. The notorious outlaw Johannes Bückler, or “Schinderhannes”, to use the nickname by which he is best known, came early on in his career of lawlessness to Liebshausen, where he was wounded in a brawl at an inn when somebody fired a shotgun at him.

Population development
What follows is a table of population figures for Liebshausen from selected years since the Congress of Vienna (at 31 December each time):

Politics

Municipal council
The council is made up of 12 council members, who were elected by majority vote at the municipal election held on 7 June 2009, and the honorary mayor as chairwoman.

Mayor
Liebshausen’s mayor is Matthias Merscher.

Coat of arms
The municipality’s arms might be described thus: Tierced in mantle dexter argent a cross gules, sinister Or an eagle displayed sable armed and langued of the second, and in base azure a bell hanging from its yoke of the first.

Culture and sightseeing

Buildings
The following are listed buildings or sites in Rhineland-Palatinate’s Directory of Cultural Monuments:
 Saint Anthony the Hermit’s Catholic Church (branch church; Filialkirche Hl. Antonius Eremit), Hauptstraße 10 – 1821–1825, architect Royal Building Inspector Maeber, thereafter F. Nebel, Koblenz, belltower 1873, new building work on nave 1950; in the quire a Crucifix, Body of Christ from early 17th century
 Hauptstraße 9 – former inn “Caspar”; timber-frame building, partly solid or slated, mid 19th century

References

External links

Municipality’s official webpage 
Brief portrait of Liebshausen with film at SWR Fernsehen 

Municipalities in Rhineland-Palatinate
Rhein-Hunsrück-Kreis